Krestovozdvizhenka is a rural locality (a selo) in Krestovozdvizhensky Selsoviet of Konstantinovsky District, Amur Oblast, Russia. The population was 987 as of 2018. There are 16 streets.

Geography 
Krestovozdvizhenka is located 19 km north of Konstantinovka (the district's administrative centre) by road. Klyuchi is the nearest rural locality.

References 

Rural localities in Konstantinovsky District